Seydabad (also Romanized as Şeydābād; also known as Şeydābād-e Rūdkhāneh) is a village in Qareh Chay Rural District, in the Central District of Saveh County, Markazi Province, Iran. At the 2006 census, its population was 64, in 11 families.

References 

Populated places in Saveh County